is a former Japanese football player.

Club statistics

References

External links
j-league

1987 births
Living people
Tokoha University alumni
Association football people from Shizuoka Prefecture
Japanese footballers
J2 League players
Japan Football League players
Ventforet Kofu players
FC Kariya players
Azul Claro Numazu players

Association football defenders